Shivajinagar Assembly constituency is one of the twenty one constituencies of Maharashtra Legislative Assembly located in Pune district and one of eight in Pune City.

It is a segment of the Pune (Lok Sabha constituency) along with five other assembly constituencies, viz Kasba Peth, Parvati, Pune Cantonment (SC), Kothrud, Vadgaon Sheri from Pune.

Members of Legislative Assembly

Election results

2019 Assembly Election

2014 Assembly Election

2009 Assembly Election

1980 Assembly Election 
 Anna Joshi (BJP) : 26,273 votes 
 Shridhar Madgulkar (INC-Indira) : 25,500 votes

1962 Assembly Election 
 Sadashiv Govind Barve (INC) : 30,306 votes 
 Ramchandra Kashinath Mhalagi (Jana Sangh) : 14723

See also
 For Vidhana Sabha constituency with the same name in Bengaluru, Karnataka, see Shivajinagar (Vidhana Sabha constituency)
 List of constituencies of Maharashtra Legislative Assembly

References

Assembly constituencies of Pune district
Assembly constituencies of Maharashtra
Monuments and memorials to Shivaji